João Luiz Ramires Vieira, known as João Luiz (born December 20, 1985 in Brazil), is a footballer playing as a midfielder.

He made his debut for Marítimo on December 23, 2007 in a 2–1 away victory against União Leiria. His first and so far only goal for the club came in a 4–1 defeat of Sporting Braga at home on April 19, 2008.

External links
Profile at Foradejogo

1985 births
Living people
Brazilian footballers
Primeira Liga players
C.S. Marítimo players
Rio Branco Esporte Clube players
Al Hala SC players

Association football midfielders